Wirt is an unincorporated community in Jefferson County, Indiana, in the United States.

A post office was established at Wirt in 1834. The community was named for William Wirt, a pioneer.

References

Unincorporated communities in Jefferson County, Indiana
Unincorporated communities in Indiana